David Casasnovas is a former Spanish professional football player.

Career
Casasnovas spent his career in Switzerland. He won promotion to Swiss Super League with SR Delémont in 2002 and Neuchâtel Xamax in 2007.

In his career he played 283 games in the Swiss national league and scored 63 times. He played 1 season in the Super League and 11 in the second division (Challenge League).

External links
football.ch profile 

1979 births
Living people
Swiss men's footballers
Association football forwards
Swiss Super League players
FC Biel-Bienne players
FC Solothurn players
SR Delémont players
FC La Chaux-de-Fonds players
Neuchâtel Xamax FCS players
People from La Chaux-de-Fonds
Sportspeople from the canton of Neuchâtel